Neosartorya pseudofischeri is a fungus first isolated at an autopsy from a fungal lesion occurring in human neck vertebrae. Its ascospore morphology was identical to that of Aspergillus thermomutatus.

Neosartorya species are the sexual states (teleomorph) of Aspergillus species, notably the Aspergillus fumigatus group among others.

References

Further reading

External links

 MycoBank

Trichocomaceae
Fungi described in 1992